Iqbal Review (Punjabi,), is a bilingual academic journal dedicated to the memory of Muhammad Iqbal. It is published by the Iqbal Academy (Pakistan).

Overview 
The journal covers research on the life, poetry and thought of Allama Muhammad Iqbal and on those branches of knowledge in which he was interested: Islamic studies, philosophy, history, sociology, comparative religion, literature, art, and archaeology. It is issued twice a year, in April and October.

History 
The Iqbal Review was established in April 1960.

See also 
 Iqbal bibliography
 Muhammad Iqbal
 Iqbal Academy Pakistan

References

External links 
 
 http://www.allamaiqbal.com/review
 http://www.allamaiqbal.com/iqbaliyat
 http://www.iqbalcyberlibrary.net

Quarterly journals
Magazines published in Pakistan
Muhammad Iqbal
English-language journals
Publications established in 1960
Memorials to Muhammad Iqbal